Auchnarrow is a village in Moray, Scotland.

Villages in Moray